Ysgol Bryn Elian is an 11–18 English-medium co-educational comprehensive school on Windsor Drive in Old Colwyn.  Along with Eirias High School and Coleg Llandrillo (which is sixth-form-level only) it serves the state secondary education sector in the Colwyn Bay area. The school has been in existence since the 1970s, when it was initially created as a secondary modern school to accept those unable to get into the town's grammar school, Eirias High School. In the mid-seventies, the Secretary of State for Education ordered both schools to become comprehensives.

History

Ysgol Bryn Elian's history prior to 1988 was largely uneventful, in that its performance was considered satisfactory to good in the inspections by Estyn.  In 1988, following the retirement of the incumbent headteacher and the secondment of a Deputy, the school underwent significant change, however, occasioned, in large part, by the appointment of a new head teacher (James Whippe) with significant inner-city education experience, gained in both London and Liverpool, and a temporary, later to be made permanent, deputy.

Today
The School recently won the Wales Quality Award "Prize for Learning". To date they are the only school in Wales to do so. 
The school has played host to the band the Ordinary Boys on the first day of BBC Radio 1's Star Pupil competition in early 2007 and has also seen the likes of Lil' Chris and European Gold and Olympic Silver Medallist, Campbell Walsh making appearances.

They have a highly successful music department, achieving many prizes in the Urdd Eisteddfod and producing high quality musical performances. In 2009 they gained 1st place in the county round, progressing to the national finals in Cardiff and have won the Learner's Cerdd Dant Party Competition nationally for 4 years running. Their D of E programme is widely considered to be one of the best in the area due to the sheer number of participants who achieve Bronze Silver and Gold, amounting to more than produced by the rest of the county. Estyn commented: "One way in which the school’s values are exemplified is through the provision of a wide range of extra-curricular activities such as the Duke of Edinburgh’s Award, whereby the school enables a very large number of students to participate in the Award. The school has produced more than half of the gold Award winners in the county of Conwy."

The school also embarks on a great deal of charity work which recently has seen them raising money to develop a school in Madagascar, with an eventual target of £11,000.

They recently received 85% passed A Level results. This led to a place alongside Ysgol Y Creuddyn, Ysgol Dyffryn Conwy and Ysgol Aberconwy in Band 2, in the Conwy Round of best schools in North Wales.

In the 2012 A-Level Results 93% passed 
In the 2013 A-Level results, all first choice universities were gained. The 2013 GCSE results were 97% 5 A*-C.

Its feeder schools are:
Ysgol Cynfran  (Llysfaen)
Ysgol Hen Golwyn (Old Colwyn)
Ysgol Llanddulas  (Llanddulas)
Ysgol Tan Y Marian (Peulwys)
Ysgol Y Plas (Llanelian)

References

External links
Ysgol Bryn Elian website
 Estyn inspection reports
Welsh Government Secondary School Banding table

Old Colwyn
Secondary schools in Conwy County Borough
Educational institutions established in 1970
1970 establishments in Wales